This is a list of statues and busts of presidents of the United States.

George Washington

John Adams

Thomas Jefferson

James Madison

James Monroe

John Quincy Adams

Andrew Jackson

Martin Van Buren

William Henry Harrison

John Tyler

James K. Polk

Zachary Taylor

Millard Fillmore

Franklin Pierce

James Buchanan

Abraham Lincoln

Andrew Johnson

Ulysses S. Grant

Rutherford B. Hayes

James A. Garfield

Chester A. Arthur

Grover Cleveland

Benjamin Harrison

William McKinley

Theodore Roosevelt 

Oyster Bay Statue Rough Rider

William Howard Taft

Woodrow Wilson

Warren G. Harding

Calvin Coolidge

Herbert Hoover

Franklin D. Roosevelt

Harry S. Truman

Dwight D. Eisenhower

John F. Kennedy

Lyndon B. Johnson

Richard Nixon

Gerald Ford

Jimmy Carter

Ronald Reagan

George H. W. Bush

Bill Clinton

George W. Bush

Barack Obama

Donald Trump

See also 
 Mount Rushmore
 Presidential memorials in the United States
 List of Confederate monuments and memorials

References